T'alla Kallanka (Quechua t'alla outstanding woman of the Inca aristocracy, kallanka large roofed building used for celebrations during the Inca Empire, Hispanicized spelling Tallacallanca) is a mountain in the Wansu mountain range in the Andes of Peru, about  high. It is situated in the Apurímac Region, Antabamba Province, Oropesa District. T'alla Kallanka lies west of Millu and northwest of Mina Q'asa.

References 

Mountains of Peru
Mountains of Apurímac Region